Nayakas of Keladi (1499–1763), also known as Nayakas of Bednore and Ikkeri Nayakas, were an Indian dynasty based in Keladi in present-day Shimoga district of Karnataka, India. They were an important ruling dynasty in post-medieval Karnataka. They initially ruled as a vassal of the famous Vijayanagar Empire. After the fall of the empire in 1565, they gained independence and ruled significant parts of Malnad region of the Western Ghats in present-day Karnataka, most areas in the coastal regions of Karnataka, and parts of northern Kerala, Malabar and the central plains along the Tungabhadra river. In 1763 AD, with their defeat to Hyder Ali, they were absorbed into the Kingdom of Mysore. They played an important part in the history of Karnataka, during a time of confusion and fragmentation that generally prevailed in South India after the fall of the Vijayanagar Empire. The Keladi rulers were of the Vokkaliga and Banajiga castes and were Veerashaivas by faith. The Haleri Kingdom that ruled over Coorg between 1600 A.D and 1834 A.D. was founded by a member of the Keladi family.

Nayaka clan
Chaudappa Nayaka, originally Chauda Gowda, (1499–1530), was from a village called Pallibailu near Keladi. He was the son of couple Basavappa and Basavamambe, who were into farming. He was the earliest chieftain to rule the area surrounding Shimoga, rose through self capability and acumen and was a feudatory of Vijayanagara Empire.

Sadashiva Nayaka (1530–1566) was an important chieftain in the Vijayanagar Empire and earned the title Kotekolahala from emperor Aliya Rama Raya for his heroics in the battle of Kalyani.
The coastal provinces of Karnataka came under his direct rule. He moved the capital to Ikkeri some 20 km. from Keladi.

Sankanna Nayaka (1566–1570), succeeded Sadashiva Nayaka.

Chikka Sankanna Nayaka (1570–1580) was an opportunistic ruler who took advantage of the confusion in the Vijayanagar Empire following its defeat at Tallikota and grabbed a few provinces in Uttara Kannada district.

Rama Raja Nayaka (1580–1586)

Hiriya Venkatappa Nayaka (1586–1629) is considered by scholars as ablest monarch of the clan. He completely freed himself from the overlordship of the relocated Vijayanagar rulers of Penugonda. Italian traveller Pietro Della Valle, who visited his kingdom in 1623, called him an able soldier and administrator. In his reign the kingdom expanded so that it covered coastal regions, Malnad regions, and some regions to the east of the western Ghats of present-day Karnataka. He is also known to have defeated the Adilshahis of Bijapur in Hanagal. Though a Virashaiva by faith, he built many temples for Vaishnavas and Jains and a mosque for Muslims. He defeated the Portuguese in 1618 and 1619.

Virabhadra Nayaka (1629–1645) faced many troubles from the start, including competition from rival Jain chieftains of Malenad for the throne of Ikkeri and invasion by the Sultanate armies of Bijapur. Ikkeri was plundered by the Bijapur army during his time. 

Shivappa Nayaka  (1645–1660) is widely considered as the ablest and greatest of the Keladi rulers. He was the uncle of Virabhadra Nayaka. Shivappa deposed his nephew to gain the throne of Keladi. He was not only an able administrator; he also patronised literature and fine arts. His successful campaigns against the Bijapur sultans, the Mysore kings, the Portuguese, and other Nayakas of the neighbouring territories east of the western ghats helped expand the kingdom to its greatest extent, covering large areas of present-day Karnataka. He gave importance to agriculture and developed new schemes for collection of taxes and revenues which earned him much praise from later British officials. A statue of him and the palace built by him containing many artifacts of his times are reminders of the respect he has earned even from the present generation of people of the region. He destroyed the Portuguese political power in the Kanara region by capturing all the Portuguese forts of the coastal region.

Chikka Venkatappa Nayaka (1660–1662), ruled for a short span of time after Shivappa Nayaka.

Bhadrappa Nayaka (1662–1664), succeeded Chikka Venkatappa Nayaka. During his reign the rule of Vokkaligas came to an end and was replaced by the rule of Banajigas. 

Somashekara Nayaka I (1664–1672) The King who was once a good administrator, gave up his interest in administration after his association with a dancer named Kalavati. Bharame Mavuta, a relative of Kalavati slow poisoned the king which eventually led to his death.

Keladi Chennamma (1672–1697) She was an able ruler who some scholars claim was allied with the Maratha Shivaji and later his son Sambhaji to defeat all rival claimants to the throne. She gave shelter to Chhatrapathi Rajaram when he fled from the Mughal army. Chennamma of Keladi is well remembered by local people through tales of her bravery.

Basavappa Nayaka (1697–1714) He was a brave ruler and was adopted by Rani Chennammaji from their relative
Markappa Shetty of Bedanur

Somashekara Nayaka II (1714–1739)

Kiriya Basavappa Nayaka (1739–1754)

Chenna Basappa Nayaka (1754–1757)

Queen Virammaji (1757–1763) was defeated by Hyder Ali who merged the Keladi kingdom with the Kingdom of Mysore. The queen was captured by Hyder Ali and was kept in confinement along with her son in the fort of Madugiri. They were however rescued in 1767 when Madhavrao I of the Maratha Empire defeated Hyder Ali in the battle of Madugiri. Later, they were sent to Pune the capital of the Maratha Empire for protection.

Decline and end
For more than two hundred years the kingdom controlled the coastal and malnad regions of present-day Karnataka and fostered a rich tradition of trade with the English, the Portuguese, and the Dutch. However, in the period of gloom brought about by the fall of the great Hindu empire, the Vijayanagar empire, constant wars—campaigns against local chieftains and the Mysore Kingdom and the harassment of the Marathas finally drained the treasury and resulted in the end of the kingdom.

Literature

Kannada
Keladinripavijayam by Linganna
Shivagita by Tirumalabhatta

Sanskrit
Shivatattvaratnakara by King Basavappa
Tattva Kausthuba by Bhattoji Dikshita
Ashvapandita by Manapriya.

Architecture

The Keladi Nayakas built some fine temples in Ikkeri and Keladi using a combination of late Kadamba, Hoysala, Vijayanagar, and Dravida styles. The use of granite for their construction shows they simply followed the Vijayanagar model of architecture. The Aghoreshwara temple at Ikkeri and the Rameshwara temple at Keladi are the best examples of the Nayakas' art. Vijayanagar-style pillars with hippogryphs are common; called yali columns (depiction of horses and lions as seen in Hampi) is found here. These are pillars with lions, either with their forepaws raised or simply in a sitting position, and pillars with a mythical horse-like animal with front legs raised, balancing on its rear legs, and with an armed rider on its back which are worth seeing at Ikkeri. A roof sculpture depicting a Gandaberunda, the mythical two-headed bird of Karnataka, is found in Keladi. Also, in the Rameshwara temple, a pillar sculpture shows Maratha Rajaram with Keladi Chennamma (history has it that Rajaram was protected by the queen when he was on the run from the Mughals).

Religious tolerance
The Keladi Nayakas were Lingayats, patronized the religion, constructed numerous mutts and were responsible for the spread of Lingayatism to the Malenadu and Coastal Karnataka.  There were sixty four mutts in the district of Dakshina Kannada alone.  Nevertheless, they were tolerant towards followers of other religions and other Hindu denominations. 
The Keladi Nayakas invited Kazi Mahmoud who was a grandson of chief kazi of Adil Shahi kingdom of Bijapur to settle in Bhatkal. The revenue of Tenginagundi village was given to Kazi Mahmoud. The kazi family of Bhatkal is popularly known as Temunday Family due to the ownership of lands in Tenginagundi. Many Nawayath Muslims were appointed in the administrative positions. The families of these nobles Nawayath still use their surnames as Ikkeri and are mainly settled in and around Bhatkal. The Golden Kalasa on the dome of Bhatkal Jamia Masjid popularly known as 'Chinnada Palli' meaning 'Golden Mosque' is believed to be a generous gift from Keladi rulers.

Gallery

See also
 History of Karnataka
 Political history of medieval Karnataka

References

Sources

 K.R. Venkataraman. The throne of transcendental wisdom: Śrī Śamkarācārya's Śāradā Pìtha in Śringeri, Page 58.
 Dr. Suryanath U. Kamath, A Concise history of Karnataka from pre-historic times to the present, Jupiter books, 2001, MCC, Bangalore (Reprinted 2002)

 
Lingayatism
Dynasties of India
History of Karnataka
Hindu dynasties